Svetoslav Nikolaevich Roerich (23 October 1904 – 30 January 1993) was a Russian painter based in India. He was the son of Helena and Nicholas Roerich, studied from a young age under his father's tutelage. He studied architecture in England in 1919 and entered Columbia University's school of architecture in 1920. He won the Grand Prix of the Sesquicentennial Exposition in Philadelphia in 1926.

Biography

He lived for many years in India where Jawaharlal Nehru awarded him the International Award and the Padma Bhushan. His paintings of Nehru and Indira Gandhi, adorn the historic Central Parliament Hall in New Delhi. He was married in 1945 to an Indian movie star Devika Rani, who was once married to producer Himanshu Rai and known as "The First Lady of the Indian Screen". Roerich died in 1993 at the age of 88 and is buried in Bangalore, India.

He was named an Honorary Academician of the Art Academy of the USSR, and was an honorary member of the Bulgarian Academy of Art.

He had a large plantation on the outskirts of Bangalore, called Tataguni, on Kanakpura road. He and Devika Rani lived here; after their respective deaths in August 2011, the Government of Karnataka acquired the estate after the Supreme Court of India passed the verdict in favour of them..

Roerich family's residence in Manali, India, is now home for a gallery of paintings. It is managed by the International Roerich Trust and has been named Roerich Heritage Museum. The gallery was founded by Svetoslav Roerich in 1962.

Work
Roerich mainly painted landscapes and portraits.
His paintings were first exhibited in India in 1936–1937 

His portrait of Indira Gandhi was unveiled in the Central Hall of the Parliament of India.

European art historians have considered his paintings to be influenced by expressionism.

Honours and awards

 Padma Bhushan (India) 
 Order of Friendship of Peoples
 Order of Madara Horseman (Bulgaria)
 Awarded Jawaharlal Nehru
 Cavalier of the Order of Cyril and Methodius (Bulgaria)
 Honorary Member of the USSR Academy of Arts
 Honorary Doctor of Veliko Tarnovo University (Bulgaria)
 Academician of the Academy of Fine Arts of India

See also
 Roerichism
 Helena Roerich
 Nicholas Roerich
 George de Roerich
 Pax Cultura
 Yuli Mikhailovich Vorontsov — president of International Centre of the Roerichs (Moscow)
 Sree Chitra Art Gallery

References

External links

"SVETOSLAV ROERICH" – A Collective by S. R. Ramaswamy
Rare Photographs of Svetoslav Roerich with World Leaders
International Roerich Memorial Trust   (India)

1904 births
1993 deaths
Painters from Saint Petersburg
People from Sankt-Peterburgsky Uyezd
Svetoslav
Baltic German people from the Russian Empire
20th-century Russian painters
Soviet painters
Soviet historians
Soviet expatriates in India
People from Kullu
Roerichism
Soviet explorers
Soviet orientalists
Fellows of the Lalit Kala Akademi